Kettering Science Academy is a secondary and sixth form school in Kettering, Northamptonshire, England, teaching pupils from age 11 to 18. It is a member of the Brooke Weston Trust and moved into a new building in September 2012.

Uniform 

Students wear a black blazer with a purple striped tie. Some students are honoured with black ties.

Computer Science 
Introduced in 2012 with the new building was a vast computer suite. The department, headed by Daniel Duncan, is one of the top performing areas of the school. The department has enjoyed a lot academic success attaining several 4s, in GCSE Computer Science. Likewise the sixth form has enjoyed similar attainment in recent years.

References 
https://reports.ofsted.gov.uk/provider/23/135967

External links 
 School website

Academies in North Northamptonshire
1969 establishments in England
Secondary schools in North Northamptonshire
Educational institutions established in 1969